Rodrigo Alejandro Goldberg Mierzejewski (born August 9, 1971) is a Chilean former international football player. As a player, he gained national notoriety in Israel for his talented play with Maccabi Tel Aviv and good use of the Hebrew language.

Time in Israel
Goldberg was an integral part of the Maccabi Tel Aviv squad that took back to back cup titles and a league championship thereafter. He had a strained relationship with club captain Avi Nimni and verbally criticized him in the Israeli media before returning to Chile.

Return to Chile
After playing for four seasons in Israel, Goldberg returned to Chile to play for Santiago Morning. During a club match against Palestino, he was subjected to anti-Semitic abuse from the oppositions supporters because of his Polish and German Jewish background. Goldberg is, however, a Catholic, as a result of the conversion of his grandparents.

After football
Goldberg graduated as a Industrial Civil Engineer at the San Sebastián University.

Since 2006, he has worked as a football commentator and analyst in both radio and TV media such as Canal del Fútbol, Fox Sports and Radio Cooperativa. In addition to this, he worked for TVN during the 2011 Copa América.

From 2019 to 2021, Goldberg worked as Sports Director of Universidad de Chile alongside his former fellow footballer Sergio Vargas.

Honours

Player
Universidad de Chile
 Primera División de Chile (2): 1994, 1995

Maccabi Tel Aviv
 Israel State Cup (2): 2001, 2002
 Israeli Premier League (1): 2002–03

References

External links
 Profile and statistics of Rodrigo Goldberg on One.co.il 
 

1971 births
Living people
Footballers from Santiago
Chilean footballers
Chile international footballers
Universidad de Chile footballers
Santiago Wanderers footballers
Maccabi Tel Aviv F.C. players
Club Deportivo Universidad Católica footballers
Santiago Morning footballers
Chilean Primera División players
Primera B de Chile players
Israeli Premier League players
Chilean expatriate footballers
Chilean expatriate sportspeople in Israel
Expatriate footballers in Israel
Chilean people of German-Jewish descent
Chilean people of Polish-Jewish descent
Association football forwards
Canal del Fútbol color commentators
Televisión Nacional de Chile color commentators
Chilean association football commentators
Chilean radio personalities